Scott Rockenfield (born June 15, 1963), also known as SRock, is an American drummer and composer. He is best known as the drummer for the progressive metal band Queensrÿche, which he co-founded in 1982, and the hard rock band Slave to the System.

Biography

Early years
Rockenfield was born and raised in Seattle, Washington. He started playing music at the age of 11, after he saw some drums in elementary school and wanted to play on them. That Christmas, his parents got him a cheap drum kit. In the sixth grade, he became classmates with Chris DeGarmo, who would later become the guitarist in his band.

While attending Redmond High School, he took special interest in music and film. Guitarist Kelly Gray, who would be a guitarist in Queensrÿche between 1998 and 2002 and with whom Rockenfield played in Slave to the System, went to the same high school and graduated in the same year as Rockenfield. Rockenfield cites Judas Priest, Boston and Kiss as his early influences, and later he also became a big fan of Rush, Van Halen, Iron Maiden, The Police and Pink Floyd; bands that were progressive and, "really pushed the envelope".

Career
Together with guitarist Michael Wilton, whom he met at Easy Street Records in Seattle, Rockenfield formed the band Cross+Fire in 1980. They covered songs from popular heavy metal bands such as Iron Maiden and Judas Priest. Before long, guitarist Chris DeGarmo and bassist Eddie Jackson joined Cross+Fire, and the band name was changed to The Mob. In 1982, they recruited Geoff Tate on vocals and the band continued under the name Queensrÿche. Rockenfield has been with the band ever since, however he has been on indefinite hiatus since 2017.

Rockenfield and Paul Speer wrote and recorded an instrumental progressive rock album in 2000 entitled Hells Canyon, which is inspired by places and events in the Idaho region of Hells Canyon. The album received good reviews. In 2001, Rockenfield collaborated with former Queensrÿche guitarist Kelly Gray and the Brother Cane members Damon Johnson and Roman Glick in a hard rock project named Slave to the System, releasing one eponymous album. Their album was re-released in 2006 on Spitfire Records. In 2008, Rockenfield released a solo album, named The X Chapters. In 2013, Rockenfield played drums on the Headless album Growing Apart, which also includes vocalist Göran Edman and the Italian guitarists Walter Cianciusi and Dario Parente.

In 2017 Rockenfield took a hiatus from Queensrÿche which was originally supposed to last for a few months but then prolonged indefinitely. Former singer Geoff Tate later expressed concern for Rockenfield, suggesting that he was in a difficult life situation and current singer Todd La Torre suggested it was unlikely Rockenfield would ever return to the band.

Composer and entrepreneur
Out of all the members of Queensrÿche, Rockenfield is the most active musically outside of the band Queensrÿche. For Queensrÿche's fifth studio album Promised Land, he created a musique concrète intro using heavily processed natural sounds he recorded using a portable ADAT tape recorder. According to Rockenfield, "that was actually kind of the beginning of my journey into the film and sound design arena, so to speak, which is what I'm still doing today." Rockenfield initially started composing music for TV commercials, and later moved on to video and film scores. He writes all orchestrations on pianos and keyboards. For Queensrÿche's self-titled album from 2013, aside from contributing drum parts, Rockenfield created orchestral arrangements, saying: "The great thing is that I can combine both [of my main activities] on the new Queensryche album where I’ve written a bunch of songs, but I also wrote the orchestra pieces in some of the songs.

In 1997, Rockenfield and Speer created a music and video work named "TeleVoid", for which they received a Grammy nomination in the "Best Longform Video" category. In 2010, Rockenfield founded Hollywood Loops, that specializes in sound effects for film, television and video game composing. That same year, he also composed and recorded drum tracks for the Activision video game Call of Duty: Black Ops. In 2013 he scored the trailer to the films After Earth and he will be scoring the trailer for the 2014 remake of RoboCop. For these trailers, Rockenfield creates the music, and James "Jimbo" Barton is the acting mixer and producer; Barton has also worked with Queensrÿche on several of their albums. Rockenfield does a lot of his work, most notably the recording of his orchestral arrangements, in the Klaus Badelt Studios in Santa Monica, California.

In 2003, Rockenfield founded RockenWraps, which supplies customized drum wraps to artists and companies such as ddrum, and Bucketdrums, which are 3.5 and 5 gallon buckets fitted with 12" drum heads.

Equipment
Rockenfield uses ddrum drums, Paiste cymbals, Pearl and Gibraltar hardware, Attack drumheads and Easton Ahead drumsticks. His kit often carries his signature "chain" motif.

His set up is made up of:

 8" × 7" Tom
 10" × 8" Tom
 12" × 8" Tom
 13" × 9" Tom
 14" × 10" Tom
 16" × 16" Floor tom
 16" × 12" Floor tom (suspended)
 18" × 14" Floor tom (suspended)
 22" × 20" Bass drum
 22" × 20" Bass drum 
 14" × 6" Snare drum
 13" × 7" Snare drum

 13" Signature Heavy Hi-Hat
 18" Signature Heavy China
 17" Signature Power Crash
 18" Signature Power Crash
 19" Signature Power Crash
 10" Signature Splash
 18" Signature Heavy China
 20" Signature Reflector Dry Ride
 16" Signature Power Crash

Personal life
Rockenfield married Cara Kaye Whitney on September 28, 1991  after dating each other for 5 years. Rockenfield and Whitney divorced in 1996. They did not have any children between them. Rockenfield later married Misty Rockenfield, but they divorced early 2017. They have three children. His hobbies include photography.

Discography

Queensrÿche

With Paul Speer
 TeleVoid (1997)
 Hells Canyon (2000)

Slave to the System
 Slave to the System (2002/2006)

Solo
 The X Chapters (2008)

Headless
 Growing Apart (2013)

Soundtrack appearances

References

External links
Official home page

1963 births
Queensrÿche members
Living people
American heavy metal drummers
Musicians from Seattle
Progressive metal musicians
20th-century American drummers
American male drummers
Glam metal musicians